Not Mathematics is the first extended play released by the English rock band Casimir. The first video from this release was "Balancing Act", premiered on NME.com in January 2013, followed by the release of the singles "Like Whistles" and "Lucid" in February and March respectively.

Track listing

Release history

References

2013 debut EPs